The Zabadeans were an Arab tribe attacked and looted by Jonathan upon his return from Damascus after chasing an army which had escaped over the river Eleutherus.

References

Tribes of Arabia